Passage to Arcturo is the first EP by Greek extreme metal band Rotting Christ, released in 1991. It was originally an MLP-pressing only: first edition in gatefold cover; second edition with normal cover. The EP was re-released in February 2011 with "The Old Coffin Spirit (Live)", "The Mystical Meeting (Live)" and "The Forest of N'Gai (Live)" as bonus tracks on MCD.

Track listing

Original edition

In 2006, Unruly Sounds reissued Passage to Arcturo with the three above noted bonus tracks. Furthermore, the introduction was removed (bringing the Unruly Sounds version to 8 tracks total rather than the 9 it would be if the introduction were featured).

References

Rotting Christ albums
1991 albums
1991 EPs